Otuke (Otuque, Otuqui) is an extinct language of the Macro-Jê family, related to Bororo. Otuke territory included what is now the Otuquis National Park and Integrated Management Natural Area in eastern Bolivia.

Etymology
Combès (2012) suggests that -toki ~ -tuki ~ -tuke (also present in the ethynonym Gorgotoqui) is likely related to the Bororo animate plural suffix -doge (i.e., used to form plural nouns for ethnic groups). Hence, the name Otuqui (Otuke) was likely etymologically related to the name Gorgotoqui.

Other varieties

Loukotka (1968)
Several attested extinct Bororoan varieties were either dialects of Otuke or closely related:
Covareca - Santa Ana mission, Bolivia
Curuminaca - Casalvasco mission, Bolivia
Coraveca (Curave, Ecorabe) - Santo Corazón mission, Bolivia
Curucaneca (Curucane, Carruacane) - San Rafael mission, Bolivia
Tapii - Santiago de Chiquitos mission, Bolivia

Chiquitano speakers also lived in many of the missions.

(See Jesuit Missions of Chiquitos for locations.)

Mason (1950) says the first four are "separate and very different", but Loukotka (1968) notes that nothing is known of Curave or Curucane (or of Tapii), that only 14 words of Curumina and 19 of Covare have been preserved.

Mason (1950)
Mason (1950) lists the following varieties of Otuke:

Otuke
Otuké
Covareca
Curuminaca
Coraveca (?); Curavé (?)
Curucaneca (?)
Tapii (?)

Mason (1950) notes that Tapii may have been either Otukean or Zamucoan.

The following are listed as Bororo varieties by Mason (1950):
Bororo
Eastern: Orarimugudoge
Western: Cabasal; Campanya
Acioné
Aravira
Biriuné
Coroa (?)
Coxipo (?)

Further reading
de Créqui-Montfort, Georges and Paul Rivet. 1912. Linguistique Bolivienne: Le groupe Otuké. Journal de la Société des Américanistes IX: 317–352.
de Créqui-Montfort, Georges and Paul Rivet. 1913. Linguistique Bolivienne: Les affinités des dialectes Otuké. Journal de la Société des Américanistes X: 369–377.

References

Bororoan languages
Extinct languages of South America
Languages of Brazil
Indigenous languages of the South American Chaco
Jesuit Missions of Chiquitos
Mamoré–Guaporé linguistic area